Hernán Javier Piquín (Los Polvorines, November 13 from 1973) is an Argentine dancer and choreographer. He was born in the city of Los Polvorines, in the northwest of Greater Buenos Aires, 33 km from the center of the Federal Capital. He attended the Higher Institute of Art of the Teatro Colón.

Biography 

In 1985 he was invited as an honor student by the School of the English National Ballet (in London), where he was named "solo dancer" and as "principal dancer" at Le Jeune Ballet de France (in Paris).

In 1992 he joined the Teatro Colón's Stable Ballet. Since 1994 he has worked as principal dancer in the Argentine Ballet of Julio Bocca, with which he toured Europe, Asia, Africa and the entire American continent.

In 1998 he joined the Smuin Ballets/SF (San Francisco Ballet), with whom he performed Medea, Q to V and Homeless.

In 2002 he replaced Julio Bocca in the main role of the show Boccatango which was presented at the International Transplant Congress, at the Jackie Glackson Theater (in Miami).

In 2003, Andrea Candela (Julio Bocca's assistant) created the play September, especially for Hernán Piquin and Cecilia Figaredo, which they premiered that same year at the Teatro Ópera in Buenos Aires.

In October 2004 he starred in  Orfeo  (by José Limón) at the Teatro Ópera in the city of Buenos Aires.

He premiered "Tango", "Coven" and "Ketiak" at the Borges Cultural Center, with choreographies by Ana María Stekelman and Oscar Aráiz.

In 2005 he participated in the «Eighty Years Gala» of the Stable Ballet of the Teatro Colón. the AlternativaTeatral.com website.

In 2006 he premiered Hernán Buenosayres, angel and demon .

In 2007 he worked as principal dancer for the Teatro Colón Ballet.

In 2008 he starred in the film Aniceto, by Leonardo Favio.

In 2009 he participated in the soap opera Herencia de amor (by Telefé).

In 2010 he coached the media character Fabio La Mole Moli, in the television contest Dancing for a Dream, by Marcelo Tinelli.

In 2011 he participated in this same contest (along with Noelia Pompa) and won it. For this he was criticized by several Argentine dancers.

He participated in the second consecutive year in Dancing for a dream, since as the winner of 2011 he had the opportunity to return to Dancing for a drem 2012 and became champion of the contest, thus becoming the first two-time champion in the history of this dance contest.

In 2014, for the third time in a row, he reached the final of Dancing for a Dream (this time with Cecilia Figaredo), he became runner-up losing against the couple made up of the comedians Anita Martínez and Bicho Gómez.

In 2016, he presents his new show Let It Be a love story.

In 2017, he tours with: "Let It Be, a love story".

In 2019, he will participate for the third consecutive year with Macarena Rinaldi in Dancing for a dream.

In 2021 he was launched as a councilor of avanza libertad, in the Pilar Party, together with Juan Martin Tito.

Ballets and theater plays 

 Carmen
 Le corsaire
 Giselle
 Serenade
 Apollo
 Mixture, Dance in the Park (dancer).
 Stars in dance (dancer).

Filmography

Television

Other jobs

Awards and nominations

References 

Living people
Argentine dancers
Bailando por un Sueño (Argentine TV series) winners
Bailando por un Sueño (Argentine TV series) participants
Bailando por un Sueño (Argentine TV series) judges
1973 births